Bernhard is a given name and family name.

Bernhard may also refer to:

Places 
 Sankt Bernhard-Frauenhofen, Austria; a town
 Sankt Bernhard, Thuringia, Germany; a municipality in Thuringia
 Sànkt Bernhàrd, Alsace, France

Other 
 Bernhard-Theater Zürich, a theater in Zürich, Switzerland
 Operation Bernhard, a German World War II plot to destabilise the British economy by flooding the country with forged money
 Regiment Stoottroepen Prins Bernhard, an infantry regiment of the Royal Netherlands Army

See also 
 Saint Bernard (disambiguation)
 Barnard (disambiguation)
 Bernard (disambiguation)